The Nut Gatherers (Les Noisettes, literally, The Hazelnuts) is an 1882 oil painting by the French artist William-Adolphe Bouguereau. It is one of the most popular pieces at the Detroit Institute of Arts. The painting was donated to the museum by William E. Scripps in 1954.

References 
 

Paintings by William-Adolphe Bouguereau
1882 paintings
Paintings in the collection of the Detroit Institute of Arts
Paintings of children